Andreas Bauer (born 16 November 1960) is a German boxer. He competed in the men's middleweight event at the 1984 Summer Olympics.

References

External links
 

1960 births
Living people
Middleweight boxers
German male boxers
Olympic boxers of West Germany
Boxers at the 1984 Summer Olympics
Boxers from Berlin